Novosphingobium arabidopsis  is a Gram-negative, rod-shaped and aerobic bacterium from the genus Novosphingobium which has been isolated from the rhizosphere of the plant Arabidopsis thaliana. Novosphingobium arabidopsis is resistant against dichlorodiphenyltrichloroethane (DDT).

References

Acidophiles
Bacteria described in 2014
Sphingomonadales